Caryn Copeland-Wilson (born March 14, 1961) is an American amateur golfer and former professional tennis player. In 1999 she became the second person in history, after Althea Gibson, to have competed in both the US Open (tennis) and United States Women's Open Championship (golf).

Before picking up golf in her late 20s, Wilson played college tennis for Stanford University (as Caryn Copeland) and served as captain of the Cardinals' 1982 NCAA Division I championship winning side. From 1983 to 1987 she competed on the professional tour, during which time she made several appearances in grand slam tournaments. In addition to the US Open, she also featured in the singles main draw of the 1987 Australian Open and played doubles at Wimbledon.

References

External links
 
 

1961 births
Living people
American female tennis players
American female golfers
Stanford Cardinal women's tennis players
Tennis people from Arizona